Claude B. Humphrey (June 29, 1944 – December 3, 2021) was an American professional football player who played as a defensive end in the National Football League (NFL) for the Atlanta Falcons and Philadelphia Eagles. Humphrey was inducted into the Pro Football Hall of Fame in 2014. He played college football at Tennessee State University.

Professional career
Humphrey was drafted out of Tennessee State University in the first round of the 1968 NFL Draft with the third overall choice by the Falcons. Humphrey was a little All-American in 1967.

Humphrey's stellar career included being named first-team All-Pro five times (1971–74, and 1977), second-team All-Pro three times (1969, 1970, 1976), and All-NFC six times (1970–74, 1977).  He was second-team All-NFC in 1976 when Humphrey unofficially recorded a career-high 15 quarterback sacks. In addition, Humphrey was named to the Pro Bowl six times over the span of his career (1970–74 & 1977).

Humphrey finished out his career with the Philadelphia Eagles from 1979 to 1981. In 1980 Humphrey was a designated pass rusher, recording a team-high  sacks helping the Eagles become NFC champions and earn a spot in Super Bowl XV. He finished his career with an unofficial  career sacks with the Falcons and Eagles. He retired in 1981, the season before sacks were recorded as an official NFL statistic.

During Super Bowl XV, when Humphrey was called for roughing the passer against Oakland Raiders quarterback Jim Plunkett, he picked up the penalty flag and fired it back at referee Ben Dreith.

Humphrey was a member of the Georgia Hall of Fame and the Tennessee Hall of Fame. His alma mater (Tennessee State University) retired his number and inducted him into their Hall of Fame, and his high school also retired his jersey and inducted him into their Hall of Fame. He is a member of the Atlanta Falcons Ring of Honor.

The Professional Football Researchers Association named Humphrey to the PFRA Hall of Very Good Class of 2009.

Humphrey was a member of Phi Beta Sigma.

Humphrey died on December 3, 2021, at the age of 77.

Outside Football

Humphrey also had a guest appearance on The Dukes of Hazzard episode "Repo Men" in which he portrayed Big John, a counterfeiter.

Pro Football Hall of Fame 
Humphrey was a final 15 candidate in 2003, 2005, and 2006. On August 27, 2008, he was named as one of two senior candidates for the 2009 Hall of Fame election.  In August 2013, he was named as one of two senior candidates for the 2014 Hall of Fame election.

In February 2014, Claude Humphrey was elected to the Pro Football Hall of Fame on the senior ballot.

On August 2, 2014, Humphrey was officially inducted at the Enshrinement Ceremony where his bust, sculpted by Scott Myers, was unveiled.

References

External links
Biography as a finalist for the Pro Football Hall of Fame in 2006.

1944 births
2021 deaths
American football defensive ends
Atlanta Falcons players
Philadelphia Eagles players
Tennessee State Tigers football players
National Conference Pro Bowl players
National Football League Defensive Rookie of the Year Award winners
NFL Europe (WLAF) coaches
Pro Football Hall of Fame inductees
Players of American football from Memphis, Tennessee